Gardiner High School, also known as Gardiner Area High School (GAHS), is a public school serving grades 912 in Gardiner, Maine in the United States. Tigers are the school mascot. In 2016, the school had a graduating class of 136.

The Old Gardiner High School building was designed by Francis H. Fassett and built in 1870.

The Maine Ornithological Society met at the high school in 1907.

The school has a rivalry with Cony High School.

Alumni of the school include Stanford University professor David Nivison who was valedictorian at the high school in 1940 and Poet Edward Arlington Robinson who graduated from the school when ceremonies were held at the Gardiner Coliseum.

See also
List of high school football rivalries more than 100 years old

References

School buildings completed in 1870
Buildings and structures in Gardiner, Maine
Public high schools in Maine